In Mandaeism, Shatrin is a heavenly tree mentioned in the Scroll of Abatur. Shatrin is where the souls of unbaptized Mandaean children are temporarily nourished for 30 days. On the 30th day, Hibil Ziwa baptizes the souls of the children, who then continue on to the World of Light. The tree has a length of 360,000 parasangs according to the Scroll of Abatur.

MS. Borgiani Siriaci 175 (held at the Vatican Library) and Drower Collection MS. 8 (held at the Bodleian Library in Oxford), two different manuscripts of the Scroll of Abatur, have illustrations of Shatrin that differ from those of each other.

See also
Limbo
Matarta
Tree of life
Five Trees in the Gospel of Thomas

In Islam
Sidrat al-Muntaha
Ṭūbā
Zaqqum

References

Mandaean cosmology
Limbo
Afterlife places
Trees in mythology